The Tung O Ancient Trail on Lantau Island, Hong Kong, was once an important passage for villagers to commute between Tung Chung and Tai O. The coastal trail starts at modern Tung Chung in the east, passes mangroves and bays and ends in the traditional Tai O fishing village.

Features
Places and features along the trail include (front east to west)
 Tung Chung
 Hau Wong Temple, Tung Chung
 Tung Chung Playground
 San Tau
 Hau Hok Wan
 Sha Lo Wan
 Sham Shek Tsuen
 Sham Wat
 Sai Tso Wan
 Tit Tak Shue
 San Chau
 Tai O

See also
 List of hiking trails in Hong Kong

External links

 Map of Tung O Ancient Trail

Lantau Island
Tai O
Tung Chung
Hiking trails in Hong Kong